Charles Goodall (1671—May 11, 1689) is a minor English poet. A student of Eton College and then Merton College, Oxford, he wrote a number of romantic and erotic poems referring to male students at said colleges. In 1689, the year of his death, he put together a collection entitled Poems and Translations which contains 33 poems with male-male subject matter, eleven regarding women, and 13 to a mistress named 'Idera' (considered probably imaginary). A number of the homoerotic poems have been rewritten to remove the same-sex subject matter.

Goodall's father—Dr. Charles Goodall—was a London physician.

References 

1671 births
1689 deaths
English LGBT poets
English male poets
Alumni of Merton College, Oxford